Audu Innocent Ogbeh  (born 28 July 1947) is a Nigerian politician who was chairman of the People's Democratic Party (PDP) from 2001 until January 2005. He is the former  Minister of Agriculture of the Federal Republic of Nigeria from 2015–2019.

Ogbeh is also known for his literary works. He has written five plays which include three published works. One of his plays, the Epitaph of Simon Kisulu was staged at Muson Center in 2002.

Background
Ogbeh was born on July 28, 1947, in Benue State, of Idoma background. 
He attended King's College, Lagos (1967 - 1968), then studied at the Ahmadu Bello University, Zaria (1969 - 1972) and the University of Toulouse, France (1973 - 1974). He lectured at the Institute of Education, Ahmadu Bello University, Zaria (1972 - 1976) and headed the Department of Humanities, Murtala College of Arts, Science and Technology (1977 - 1979).

Political career

In 1979, he ran for office in the Benue State House of Assembly on the Platform of the National Party of Nigeria (NPN), becoming deputy speaker of the house. In 1982, he was appointed Federal Minister of Communications, and later became Minister of Steel Development. His term of office ended in December 1983,  when a military coup brought Major-General Muhammadu Buhari to power.

In 2001, he was appointed National Chairman of the People's Democratic Party (PDP), replacing Chief Barnabas Gemade. He held this position until January 2005, when he was forced to resign due to his criticism of President Olusegun Obasanjo's handling of a crisis in Anambra State.
Talking to reporters, however, Ogbeh claimed that he resigned only to avoid conflict within the party, and due to a desire to return to farming.

Later career

In December 2005, Ogbeh formally resigned from the PDP.
As of 2009, he was chairman and managing director, Efugo Farms, Makurdi, and a member of Eisenhower Exchange Fellowships Incorporated, based in Philadelphia, United States of America.

References

1947 births
Living people
Idoma people
People from Benue State
Buhari administration personnel
National Working Committee chairs
National Party of Nigeria politicians
Federal ministers of Nigeria
King's College, Lagos alumni
Ahmadu Bello University alumni
Academic staff of Ahmadu Bello University
University of Toulouse alumni